My Anthem is Soulhead's Yoshika's debut solo album. The album reached No. 286 on the Oricon charts in a one week stay on the chart. The album was only released as a CD.

Information
My Anthem is Yoshika's debut studio album. Yoshika collaborated with DSSENT, a company who produces ball caps, so those who purchased the album received a DSSENT cap. For the album, she worked closely with famous producer Aki Hishikawa, SMAP and singer/actress Mika Nakashima. Takuto Tanaka, well known for working on dramas for NHK, produced the music video I Dream (stylized as I DREAM) for the album.

I Dream was used as the promotional song for the album.

On her official blog, Yoshika said she was nervous for the release of her first solo album, but she was also excited. She thanked those that helped produce the album and fans who supported her and purchased the album.

Track listing
(Official Track List)
"Opening  My Anthem"
"All I Do"
"The Glow of Love"
"Thriller"
"Mama Used to Say"
"Natural Lady"
"I Dream"
"All I Want Is U"
"Right Here [Human Nature Remix]"
"A Long Walk"
"Time After Time"
"Change the World"
"I Dream [Makoto's 80s Legacy Remix]

References

2013 debut albums
Avex Group albums